Statistics of Allsvenskan in season 1975.

Overview
The league was contested by 14 teams, with Malmö FF winning the championship.

League table

Results

Footnotes

References 

Allsvenskan seasons
Swed
Swed
1